Abby Cunnane is a New Zealand writer and curator. She grew up on the west coast of the North Island near Raglan.

In January 2021, Cunnane took on the role of Director of Christchurch art gallery The Physics Room. Previously, Cunnane worked as Director (acting) at St Paul Street Gallery AUT from 2017 to 2018, and prior as Assistant Director from 2013 to 2017. From 2007 to 2012, Cunnane was employed by City Gallery Wellington as a curator, and worked alongside Aaron Lister on the exhibition The Obstinate Object: Contemporary New Zealand Sculpture.

With artist Amy Howden-Chapman, Cunnane is the co-editor of The Distance Plan, an exhibition platform and journal focusing on contemporary art and climate change. The Distance Plan was founded in 2011 to provide a platform for discussion about climate change within the humanities context.

Her father is a pilot, and her mother Alison Annals is a senior tutor at University of Waikato. Cunnane's brother, Sam Cunnane, is Head of School for Media Arts at Wintec.

Education 
Cunnane studied art history and English at Victoria University of Wellington.

In 2018 Cunnane completed a practice-led MPhil in curatorial writing from Auckland University of Technology In 2020 Cunnane completed two years of study in te reo Māori at Te Rōnakitanga ki te Reo Kairangi at Te Wānanga o Aotearoa in Tāmaki Makaurau.

Publications 
As author:

 Saying what You See: How to Write and Talk about Art, Alison Annals, Abby Cunnane, Sam Cunnane. Pearson Education N.Z. (2009). 

As editor:

 The Distance Plan, Distance Plan Press (2013–). Various ISBN for each issue.
 Reading Walking Writing, The Physics Room (2015).

References 

Living people
Year of birth missing (living people)
21st-century New Zealand writers
21st-century New Zealand women writers
New Zealand curators
Victoria University of Wellington alumni
Auckland University of Technology alumni
New Zealand women curators